The Fréchet inception distance (FID) is a metric used to assess the quality of images created by a generative model, like a generative adversarial network (GAN). Unlike the earlier inception score (IS), which evaluates only the distribution of generated images, the FID compares the distribution of generated images with the distribution of a set of real images ("ground truth").

The FID metric was introduced in 2017, and is the current standard metric for assessing the quality of generative models as of 2020.  It has been used to measure the quality of many recent models including the high-resolution StyleGAN1 and StyleGAN2 networks.

Definition 

INPUT two datasets .

Compute .

Technically, it is the 2048-dimensional activation vector of its pool3 layer.

Interpretation 
Rather than directly comparing images pixel by pixel (for example, as done by the L2 norm), the FID compares the mean and standard deviation of the deepest layer in Inception v3. These layers are closer to output nodes that correspond to real-world objects such as a specific breed of dog or an airplane, and further from the shallow layers near the input image. As a result, they tend to mimic human perception of similarity in images.

Variants 
Specialized variants of FID have been suggested as evaluation metric for music enhancement algorithms as Fréchet Audio Distance (FAD), for generative models of video as Fréchet Video Distance (FVD), and for AI-generated molecules as Fréchet ChemNet Distance (FCD).

Limitations 
Chong and Forsyth showed FID to be statistically biased, in the sense that their expected value over a finite data is not their true value. 
Also, because FID measured the Wasserstein distance towards the ground-truth distribution, it is inadequate for evaluating the quality of generators in domain adaptation setups, or in zero-shot generation. 
Finally, while FID is more consistent with human judgement than previously used inception score, 
there are cases where FID is inconsistent with human judgment (e.g. Figure 3,5 in Liu et al.).

See also
Fréchet distance

References 

Fréchet spaces